Holiday Sing Along with Mitch is an album by Mitch Miller and The Gang. It was released in 1961 on the Columbia label (catalog nos. CL-1701 and CS-8501).

The album debuted on Billboard magazine's popular albums chart on December 4, 1961, reached the No. 1 spot, and remained on the chart for 13 weeks. It returned to the popular albums chart in 1962 and made Billboards special holiday chart in 1963, 1964, 1965, 1966,  1967, and 1968. It was certified as a gold record by the RIAA.

AllMusic later gave the album a rating of four-and-a-half stars. Reviewer Stephen Thomas Erlewine wrote: "There are no surprises here -- Miller's records are all essentially the same; the only things that change are the songs -- but anyone who enjoys his sound should find this holiday album worth adding to their collection."

Track listing
Side 1
 "Santa Claus Is Coming to Town"
 "Frosty the Snowman"
 "I Saw Mommy Kissing Santa Claus"
 "Sleigh Ride"
 "Must Be Santa"
 "The Christmas Song (Merry Christmas to You)"

Side 2
 "Rudolph, the Red-Nosed Reindeer"
 "The Twelve Days of Christmas"
 "Winter Wonderland"
 "Let It Snow! Let It Snow! Let It Snow!"
 "Silver Bells"
 "Jingle Bells"
 "White Christmas"

References

1961 albums
Columbia Records albums
Mitch Miller albums